Andrea, Melaky is a rural municipality in western Madagascar. It belongs to the district of Maintirano, which is a part of Melaky Region. The population of the municipality was 6526 inhabitants in 2019.

The municipality is situated at 25 km North of Maintirano.

References 

Populated places in Melaky